The Kampot Municipality is a municipality in Kampot Province, in southern Cambodia. The provincial capital Kampot is located within the municipality.

Communes and villages

References 

Districts of Kampot province